Rudolf Schmidt (19 April 1894 – 7 March 1980) was an Austrian sculptor. His work was part of the sculpture event in the art competition at the 1936 Summer Olympics.

References

1894 births
1980 deaths
20th-century Austrian sculptors
Austrian male sculptors
Olympic competitors in art competitions
Artists from Vienna
20th-century Austrian male artists